Yves Moreau is a Professor of Engineering at KU Leuven. Moreau was elected a Fellow of the International Society for Computational Biology (ISCB) in 2018 for outstanding contributions to the fields of computational biology and bioinformatics.

References

Living people
Belgian bioinformaticians
Fellows of the International Society for Computational Biology
Year of birth missing (living people)
Brown University alumni